Yhoshua Leib Gould, (26 April 1925 Munkatch, Hungary – 29 September 2009 Jerusalem) also known as the Lehitakfo Chalushin, was an educator who identified himself as a Satmar Hasid, was affiliated with the Edah HaChareidis. He was the rabbi of Neturei Karta in Beit Shemesh Jerusalem, and Beis Midrash Tamar Avraham.

Biography
Yhoshua Leib Gould (or Golde) was born in Munkatch, Hungary. After the death of the Munkatcher Rebbe, Yhoshua Leib Gould moved with his parents and four sisters to Sighet. His family became close to the Sigheter Rav, Rabbi Yekusiel Yehuda Teitelbaum, and he was Bar Mitzvahed in the synagogue of the Sigheter Rebbe. He was given semicha in Dayanut the same day. It was also in Sighet that he met the Satmar Rav, Yoel Teitelbaum for the first time. With the start of the war, rumors began to reach Hungary of the crimes being committed against the Jews. The elder Mr. Gould asked the Sigheter Rav whether he should flee or stay. He was told to stay, and was deported to Ukraine as slave labor. When he returned to Hungary the Sigheter Rav told him to take his family and flee to Romania. He did, but Yhoshua Leib remained behind to stay with the Sigheter Rebbe. The Germans invaded and they were deported to Auschwitz only to be liberated a few months later. Rabbi Yekusiel Yehuda did not survive, and Yhoshua Leib became loyal to the new Rav of Sighet, Moshe Teitelbaum.

Yhoshua Leib moved to the Old City of Jerusalem, where he became involved first with Agudat Yisrael, then the Edah HaChareidis and a controversial splinter sect led by Amram Blau known as Neturei Karta. When the 1947–1949 Palestine war started, the Jordanian Legion captured the Old City, Yhoshua Leib fled first to Katamon and then to Meah Shearim. He worked for several years as a tutor and yeshivah rebbe, and even as a bricklayer and furniture carpenter.

In 1957 he was appointed a chaver, or expert consultant, of the Edah HaChareidis, having been recognized as an expert in the laws of Marriage and Divorce, then considered important due to the large number of Agunahs following the Holocaust and 1948 war. Though employed by the Eidah Cheradit, he continued to stay in contact with Amram Blau and Moses Teitelbaum. It was during this time, at the insistence of Moses Teittelbaum, that Yhoshua Leib developed a connection to the Satmar Rav, Yoel Teitelbaum.

Yhoshua Leib used his position in the Eidah Hareidis to defend Neturei Karta. Following the first Neturei Karta mission to Iran in 1999, he used his influence to convince the Edah HaChareidis to endorse that mission publicly. An endorsement was printed in the Edah HaChareidis newspaper, the Edah. He accepted the position of Rav (Rabbi) in Beis Midrash Tamar Avraham, the synagogue of Neturei Karta in Ramat Beit Shemesh.

Gould died on 29 September 2009 from complications related to congestive heart failure. A succession feud for control of his independent wing of Neturei Karta erupted between his heir apparent, R' Avraham Tzvi Rothenberg, author of L'reyacha Kamocha, and Sephardi Neturei Karta scholar Chocham Neftali Maimon.

Published works
Yhoshua Gould is the author of several works on the Shulchan Aruch and Midrash Rabbah. The most well known is Lehitakfo Chalushin ("Strengthen the Weak"), a commentary on rabbi Shlomo Ganzfried's Kitzur Shulchan Aruch. Lehitakfo Chalushin comments on each paragraph, explaining various opinions on each law and clarifying if the law as brought down by the Kitzur Shulchan Aruch is a leniency, stringency, or the principle Halachah. He defines principle Halachah as the opinion held by the majority of Ashkenazi commentators. The work also contains strong reproof for those lenient with various laws, drawing on imagery from Reshit Chochmah and other Musar literature. The introduction to Chapter 152 discusses the laws of premarital physical contact between men and women, homosexuality, and lesbianism. These laws were absent in the Kitzur Shulchan Aruch. The introduction to the work states explicitly that it was written for Modern Orthodox youth, converts to Judaism, and the newly religious.

The work was hailed as an important contribution by a few in the Haredi community despite comments critical of Agudat Israel. His approach to the prohibition of unmarried women going to the mikveh was viewed as controversial in light of Rabbi Moshe Feinstein's response on the subject in Iggros Moshe.

Controversy
An organ of the National Religious Party political party in Israel suggested Yhoshua Gould be brought up on charges for incitement due to his ruling that seminary deans and Rosh Yeshivas who give inappropriately lenient rulings to their students could be physically harmed if the matter involved questions of faith, matters of bloodshed, or sexual sins. He writes, "The fools are thieves, makers of prostitutes, and murderers in two worlds. About them it is written, 'He who sheds the blood of an evildoer is considered to have brought a pleasing sacrifice.' (Bamidbar Rabbah, Pinchas)"At a public lecture at Yeshiva Omrei Emes in October 2005, Gould slapped a yeshivah student who said there is no prohibition in Torah Law against lesbianism.

References

1925 births
2009 deaths
Haredi rabbis in Israel
Satmar rabbis
Romanian emigrants to Mandatory Palestine